The M75 mortar is designed by Military Technical Institute in Yugoslavia. It is smooth bore, muzzle-loading, high-angle-of-fire weapon used for long-range indirect fire support. Today they are produced by Serbian company PPT-Namenska AD and BNT from Bosnia and Herzegovina.

Description
M75 mortar is deployed as infantry support for destruction of personnel and enemy firing positions, for opening routes through barbed wire obstacles and mine fields, for demolition of fortified objects, for destruction of infrastructure elements, illumination and deploying smoke screens. 
The M75 model is  used to provide fire support in infantry battalions. M75 provides 15 rds rate of fire and has possibility of longer firing period when it is deployed for sustained bombardments. Mortars are considered to be very important arms as they are very effective and simple to use weapons deployed in a fire support role. It requires only 30 seconds to be transferred from transport to firing position. Since it is light regarding its caliber, it can be easily airdropped and parachuted to firing position. It uses the NSB-4B sight for firing.

Specifications

Ammunition
HE Mortar Shell
120 mm HE Mortar Shell Mk12P1-L
120 mm HE Mortar Shell M62P8
Smoke Mortar Shell
120 mm High-Smoke Mortar Shell M89
120 mm Smoke Mortar Shell M64P2
120 mm Smoke Mortar Shell M64P3
120 mm Smoke Mortar Shell Mk12
120 mm Smoke Mortar Shell Mk12-L
Illuminating Mortar Shell
120 mm Illuminating Mortar Shell M91
120 mm Illuminating Mortar Shell M87P1

Operators

Current operators
 
 : 100
 
 : 33

Former operators
 
  Al-Nusra Front: Bosnian-made, supplied via Saudi Arabia

See also 
 Soltam K6 
 Mortier 120mm Rayé Tracté Modèle F1
 120 KRH 92
 2B11
 2S12 Sani

References

External links 
 
 
 120 mm MORTAR M75 TECHNICAL DETAILS

Infantry mortars
Mortars of Yugoslavia
120mm mortars
Military equipment introduced in the 1980s